Sphaenorhynchus caramaschii, the lime treefrog, is a species of frog in the family Hylidae. It is endemic to Brazil, where it is found in the states of São Paulo, Paraná, and Santa Catarina.

References

Frogs of South America
Species described in 2007
caramaschii